Marijo Strahonja is a Croatian association football referee who currently officiates in the Prva HNL as well as UEFA competitions such as the European Champions League and the Europa League. 

Since 2004 he has officiated internationals. 

Strahonja has served as a referee in qualifying matches for Euro 2012, as well as 2010 and 2014 World Cup qualifiers.

His last important appearance was in Europa League 2015 on match day 1 between Asteras and Sparta Prague.

External links
 World Referee profile
 World Referee palmarès

References

Croatian football referees
Living people
1975 births